George Dacre, 5th Baron Dacre of Gilsland, also Baron Greystoke (ca. 1561 – 17 May 1569) was an English peer and landowner in the county of Cumberland.

He was summoned to parliament at about the age of five.

Life
Born about 1561, Dacre was the only surviving son of Thomas Dacre, 4th Baron Dacre (c. 1527 – 1566), by his marriage to Elizabeth Leyburne (1536–1567), the eldest daughter of Sir James Leyburne of Westmorland. This was his father's second marriage. He had a brother, Francis, who died in infancy, and three sisters: Anne (21 March 1557 – 19 April 1630), Mary (4 July 1563 – 7 April 1578), and Elizabeth (born 12 December 1564)

Dacre succeeded his father as Baron Dacre on  1 July 1566, at the age of five. Soon after this, his widowed mother married Thomas Howard, 4th Duke of Norfolk, but she died in childbirth on 4 September 1567, so that Dacre and his three sisters were left as members of the household of their widowed step-father, Norfolk.

The boy peer, aged no more than five, was summoned to parliament on 30 September 1566. He died on 17 May 1569, when the barony of Dacre, although claimed by his uncle Leonard, was found to have fallen into abeyance, leaving Dacre's three sisters as co-heiresses. By the age of fourteen, each of the three had been married to one of their stepbrothers, the sons of the Duke of Norfolk.

Notes

1560s births
1569 deaths
16th-century English nobility
17th-century English nobility
People from Cumberland
George Dacre, 5th Baron Dacre
Barons Dacre of Gillesland
Barons Greystoke
Royalty and nobility who died as children